Chan Zuckerberg Biohub (CZ Biohub), or simply Biohub, is a nonprofit research organization. In addition to supporting and conducting original research, CZ Biohub acts as a hub and fosters science collaboration between UC Berkeley, UC San Francisco (UCSF) and Stanford. The Biohub’s medical science research center is funded by a $600 million contribution from Facebook CEO and founder Mark Zuckerberg and his wife Priscilla Chan. It is currently co-led by Stephen Quake and Joseph DeRisi. Gajus Worthington was named as Biohub's Chief Operating Officer in 2017 and Sandra Schmid joined as Chief Scientific Officer in 2020.

History
The idea for CZ Biohub originated in 2015 when the current leaders, along with Mark Zuckerberg and Priscilla Chan, discussed the need for a collaborative effort by those three universities for fundamental medical research.

The organization's aims are to cure, prevent, and manage disease by investigating diseases and developing diagnostics and therapies. It focuses on cell biology, detection of infectious diseases around the world, developing research tools, and funding research. 

Biohub is presently headquartered next to UCSF's Mission Bay campus, with a satellite site at Stanford. It will provide basic researchers and clinical scientists with flexible laboratory space, the latest technological tools, and funding for ambitious research projects.

The Chan Zuckerberg Biohub consists of an internal team of researchers and “investigators” from the three universities.  

Joe DeRisi is co-president of CZ Biohub and a professor of Biochemistry and Biophysics at UCSF. DeRisi is known for his discovery of the SARS virus for which he was named a MacArthur fellow (the "Genius" award) in 2004.

Co-president Steve Quake is the Lee Otterson Professor of Bioengineering and Professor of Applied Physics at Stanford University. Dr. Quake is also well known for his work inventing new diagnostic tools, including the first non-invasive prenatal test for Down syndrome, and other aneuploidies.

2020 Nobel laureate Jennifer Doudna, professor of molecular and cell biology and chemistry and Li Ka Shing Chancellor's Chair in Biomedical and Health Sciences at Berkeley, and an investigator at the Howard Hughes Medical Institute, was an inaugural member of Biohub's science advisory group. Dr. Doudna is known for her pioneering work on CRISPR-Cas9, a gene-editing technology that has the potential to revolutionize genetics, molecular biology, and medicine.

Biohub is designed to allow researchers at leading institutions to collaborate and accelerate the development of breakthrough scientific and medical advancements, applications, and therapeutics. Scientists chosen as Biohub investigators are working on a wide range of projects, but the selection committee tried to focus on new technologies and the basic science and mechanism behind diseases. Since inception, 37 investigators have been chosen from Berkeley, 61 from UCSF, and 63 from Stanford. Biohub is structured as a nonprofit, tax-exempt organization, but it retains control of the outcomes of its efforts, including patent rights. To increase access to scientific research and promote open science, CZ Biohub requires its investigators and staff scientists to publish submitted manuscripts and related data on preprints servers like bioRxiv.

Two of the three universities in Biohub already have affiliations with major medical research facilities. Stanford University is affiliated with the VA Palo Alto Health Care System. VAPAHCS maintains the third-largest research program in the VA with extensive research centers in geriatrics, mental health, Alzheimer's disease, spinal cord regeneration, schizophrenia, Rehabilitation Research and Development Center, HIV research, and a Health Economics Resource Center. UCSF is affiliated with the UCSF Medical Center,
the leading hospital in California, and the San Francisco VA Medical Center. SFVAMC has the largest funded research program in the Veterans Health Administration with $90.2 million in research expenditures (2015). The current Medical Center Director is Bonnie S. Graham. Berkeley, though not having a hospital affiliation, has top-ranked faculties in the sciences as well as the University of California Botanical Garden, a resource for pharmacological research.

CZ Biohub has played a role in: COVID-19 response, the identification of viruses using metagenomic sequencing data,  advanced 3D imaging,  the Human Cell Atlas,  infectious disease research, and the biology of mosquitos.

Priscilla Chan and Mark Zuckerberg's other philanthropy, the Chan Zuckerberg Initiative, has recently provided grant funding for an AI tool to make millions of published medical/scientific findings more readily accessible.

References

External links 

 

Medical research institutes in the United States
Medical and health organizations based in California